Thamarai (தாமரை) is a popular Tamil lyricist, poet and Tamil journalist. She predominantly works in the Tamil film industry.

Filmography

Television
 2003 Penn
 2009 Latchiyam
 2013 Chithiram Pesuthadi
 2013 Kurinji Malar

References 

Indian filmographies
Actress filmographies